Leonard Hector Clarke (23 June 1905 – 26 January 1975) was an Australian rules footballer who played with Carlton in the Victorian Football League (VFL).

Notes

External links 

Len Clarke's profile at Blueseum

1905 births
Carlton Football Club players
Australian rules footballers from Victoria (Australia)
Coburg Football Club players
1975 deaths